Marion County is a county in the U.S. state of West Virginia. As of the 2020 census, the population was 56,205. Its county seat is Fairmont. The county was named in honor of General Francis Marion (ca. 1732–1795), known to history as "The Swamp Fox".

Marion County comprises the Fairmont, WV Micropolitan Statistical Area, which is part of the larger Morgantown–Fairmont, WV Combined Statistical Area.

History
The Adena and successor Hopewell cultures flourished in this area at one time. The region which includes the land now known as Marion County was sparsely occupied by Native Americans, if at all, in the late 18th century. Like much of the Ohio Valley, it had been depopulated by the Iroquois during the later Beaver Wars (1670–1700). Only a few abortive attempts to start European settlements upon the Monongahela River or its branches (such as that which gave its name to Dunkard Creek) are known prior to the French and Indian War. It was not until 1772 that any permanent settlements were made in this region.

Marion County was created by an act of the Virginia Assembly on January 14, 1842, from parts of Monongalia and Harrison Counties. It was named after General Francis Marion, of American Revolutionary War fame, known to history as "The Swamp Fox".

1852 was an eventful time in Marion County's history, starting with the great flood on Monday, April 5. Heavy rains the day before caused the Monongahela and West Fork Rivers to rise at rate of 5 feet per hour until Tuesday afternoon, when the water reached 43 feet above its normal level. The greatest damage was sustained on the West Fork, where over 40 houses and buildings were swept away and floated past Fairmont.

The flood damaged the railroad, which was in the final stages of being completed. By June 23 the Baltimore and Ohio Railroad was completed, connecting Fairmont to the west and to large cities in the east like Baltimore. The railroad required the building of a bridge to cross the Monongahela River about 1 mile west of Fairmont. This was achieved by building a massive iron bridge spanning 650 feet and lifted 35 feet above the water.

The third major event of the year 1852 was the completion of the Fairmont and Palatine suspension bridge, connecting Fairmont to what was then the town of Palatine. The bridge was built under the direction of James L. Randolph, assistant engineer of the Baltimore and Ohio Railroad, at a cost of about thirty thousand dollars.

Marion was one of fifty Virginia counties that were admitted to the Union as the state of West Virginia on June 20, 1863, at the height of the Civil War.  In the months that followed, West Virginia's counties were divided into civil townships, with the intention of encouraging local government.  This proved impractical in the heavily rural state, and in 1872 the townships were converted into magisterial districts.  Marion County was divided into seven districts: Fairmont, Grant, Lincoln, Mannington, Paw Paw, Union, and Winfield.  In the 1980s, the historic magisterial districts were consolidated into three new districts: Middletown, Palatine, and West Augusta.

Geography

Major highways
 Interstate 79
 U.S. Highway 19
 U.S. Highway 250
 West Virginia Route 218
 West Virginia Route 273
 West Virginia Route 310

Adjacent counties
Monongalia County (north)
Taylor County (southeast)
Harrison County (south)
Wetzel County (west)

Demographics

2000 census
As of the census of 2000, there were 56,598 people, 23,652 households, and 15,515 families living in the county.  The population density was 183 people per square mile (71/km2).  There were 26,660 housing units at an average density of 86 per square mile (33/km2).  The racial makeup of the county was 95.10% White, 3.22% Black or African American, 0.20% Native American, 0.41% Asian, 0.01% Pacific Islander, 0.13% from other races, and 0.93% from two or more races.  0.70% of the population were Hispanic or Latino of any race.

There were 23,652 households, out of which 26.00% had children under the age of 18 living with them, 51.40% were married couples living together, 10.70% had a female householder with no husband present, and 34.40% were non-families. 28.90% of all households were made up of individuals, and 13.90% had someone living alone who was 65 years of age or older.  The average household size was 2.34 and the average family size was 2.88.

In the county, the population was spread out, with 20.60% under the age of 18, 10.50% from 18 to 24, 26.40% from 25 to 44, 24.70% from 45 to 64, and 17.80% who were 65 years of age or older.  The median age was 40 years. For every 100 females there were 90.60 males.  For every 100 females age 18 and over, there were 87.30 males.

The median income for a household in the county was $28,626, and the median income for a family was $37,182. Males had a median income of $29,005 versus $21,100 for females. The per capita income for the county was $16,246.  About 11.70% of families and 16.30% of the population were below the poverty line, including 21.30% of those under age 18 and 8.70% of those age 65 or over.

2010 census
As of the census of 2010, there were 56,418 people, 23,786 households, and 15,271 families living in the county.

The racial makeup of the county was 94.3% white, 3.3% black or African American, 0.5% Asian, 0.2% American Indian, 0.2% from other races, and 1.5% from two or more races. Those of Hispanic or Latino origin made up 0.9% of the population. In terms of ancestry, 23.5% were German, 17.8% were Irish, 13.7% were American, 12.0% were English, and 10.3% were Italian.

Of the 23,786 households, 27.1% had children under the age of 18 living with them, 48.5% were married couples living together, 11.1% had a female householder with no husband present, 35.8% were non-families, and 29.3% of all households were made up of individuals. The average household size was 2.32 and the average family size was 2.85. The median age was 41.0 years.

The median income for a household in the county was $38,115 and the median income for a family was $49,046. Males had a median income of $38,948 versus $27,179 for females. The per capita income for the county was $20,752. About 11.3% of families and 16.8% of the population were below the poverty line, including 24.0% of those under age 18 and 8.6% of those age 65 or over.

Politics
Starting in 1932, Marion County tended to vote for Democrats through the 20th century, similar to many counties in West Virginia. As a matter of fact, the only time in the 20th century after 1932 that the county voted Republican was in Richard Nixon's 1972 landslide. Similar to West Virginia, the county has trended Republican in the 21st century, albeit at a slower pace as it voted Democratic through the 2000s. In 2012, Mitt Romney flipped the county and it has voted Republican since, with Trump winning more than 60% of the vote both times.

Communities

Cities
Fairmont (county seat)
Mannington
Pleasant Valley

Towns

Fairview
Barrackville
Farmington
Grant Town
Monongah
Rivesville
Whitehall
Worthington

Magisterial districts
 Middletown
 Palatine
 West Augusta

Census-designated places
 Carolina 
 Idamay 
 Rachel

Unincorporated communities

 Baxter
 Basnettville
 Beverly Hills
 Big Run
 Boothsville
 Brink
 Bunner Ridge
 Catawba
 Colfax
 Flyblow
 Forksburg
 Four States
 Grays Flat
 Hebron
 Highland
 Hopewell
 Hutchinson
 Joetown
 Jordan
 Katy
 Kingmont
 Logansport
 Meadowdale
 Metz
 Montana
 Montana Mines
 Paw Paw
 Pettyjohn
 Pine Grove
 Pleasant View
 Quiet Dell
 Shagtown
 Seven Pines
 Stringtown
 Viola
 Wahoo
 Watson
 Winfield

Notable people
David Carpenter, baseball player
Frank Kendall Everest, Jr., The Fastest Man Alive
Michael Garrison, former president of West Virginia University.
Frank Gatski, athlete in the Pro Football Hall of Fame
Sam Huff, Pro Football Hall of Fame
Johnnie Johnson, musician
John Knowles, author
Joe Manchin, the former governor of West Virginia and current senior United States senator from West Virginia.
Luella Mundel, professor and McCarthyism victim
Francis H. Pierpont, father of West Virginia
Mary Lou Retton, all-around gymnastics Olympic gold medal winner (1984 Olympic Games).
Rich Rodriguez, former college football coach (West Virginia, Michigan, Arizona)
Nick Saban, current University of Alabama head football coach
Harrison C. Summers, WWII hero
Natalie Tennant, Secretary of State of West Virginia and 2014 U.S. Senate candidate.
Robert Tinnell, Director, Writer, Producer
Hershel W. Williams, Medal of Honor recipient for the Battle of Iwo Jima
Tom Wilson, creator of the comic strip Ziggy.
Fielding H. Yost, Football Coach

Literary presence
In the 1632 series of science fiction novels, the fictional town of Grantville (closely modelled after real-life Mannington) and its environs were part of Marion County until the alien-caused space-time anomaly which sent it to 17th-century Thuringia. The county and its institutions are frequently mentioned in the course of the series, and writers interested in the series have held a number of "mini-cons" (miniature science fiction conventions) in Mannington.  Flint has stated, "The town of Grantville is very closely modeled on the actual town of Mannington. There are rules that I require everyone to follow when they write in the series. One of them is that it if it wasn’t in the town of Mannington in 2000, you can’t have it in Grantville. The one cheat I had to do was that I needed a power plant. The power plant is about 15 miles away, in a town called Granttown, so I just sorta moved it over. That’s the only real cheat.”

See also
 Prickett's Fort State Park
Fairmont Marion County Transit Authority
 National Register of Historic Places listings in Marion County, West Virginia

Footnotes

References

External links
Marion County Government

 
1842 establishments in Virginia
Populated places established in 1842
Counties of Appalachia